Tugboat Princess is a 1936 American-Canadian drama film directed by David Selman and starring Walter C. Kelly, Valerie Hobson and Edith Fellows.

Cast
 Walter C. Kelly as Captain Zack  
 Valerie Hobson as Sally  
 Edith Fellows as 'Princess' Judy  
 Clyde Cook as Steve, the engineer  
 Lester Matthews as 1st Mate Bob  
 Reginald Hincks as Captain Darling  
 Lou Callum as Policeman  
 Stuart Clarke as Judy's Doctor 
 George Hibbard as Owner of Davy Jones' Locker Restaurant  
 Arthur Kerr as Loan Shark  
 Arthur Legge-Willis as Loan Shark 
 Ethel Reese-Burns as Mrs. Price

References

Bibliography
 Mayer, Geoff. Guide to British Cinema. Greenwood Publishing Group, 2003.

External links
 

1936 films
1936 drama films
1930s English-language films
American drama films
Canadian drama films
English-language Canadian films
Films directed by David Selman
Columbia Pictures films
American black-and-white films
Canadian black-and-white films
1930s American films
1930s Canadian films